John Courtenay (1520/1521 – 1560) of Tremere (now Tremore) in the parish of Lanivet in  Cornwall, was a Member of Parliament.

Origins

He was the third child from Richard Courtenay's second marriage to Jane Boscawen. In his youth he appears to have been attached to Cromwell’s household. In the autumn of 1553, Courtenay used his family's connection with the Lostwithiel constituency to have himself elected the town's junior Member in Mary's first Parliament. In the autumn of 1555, he was elected as a Member for Penryn. He died on 1 March 1560, being buried at Lanivet, where a monument was erected to his memory. He left life interest in the Tremere property to his widow, Elizabeth Trengrove, who later married Thomas Arundell.

He represented Lostwithiel in October 1553, Bodmin in November 1554 and Penryn in 1555.

Children

Jane Courtenay
Alice Courtenay
Richard Courtenay of Tremere
Henry Courtenay
George Courtenay

References

1520 births
1560 deaths
English MPs 1553 (Mary I)
English MPs 1554–1555
English MPs 1555
Members of the Parliament of England for Helston
Members of the Parliament of England for Bodmin
Members of the Parliament of England for Penryn